
Aviafiber was a Swiss sailplane manufacturer established in Wald in February 1977 by Ernst Ruppert, Hans Farner and Heinrich Bucher. Its most famous product was the Canard 2FL, a highly unorthodox design. A test pilot was killed in the crash of one of them, leading the company to withdraw them from the market. The company's name was changed to Canard Aviation as a result of legal action by the Avia petrol company and in 1982 was absorbed into Bucher Leichtbau.

References
 
 Ruppert Composites website

Defunct aircraft manufacturers of Switzerland
Vehicle manufacturing companies established in 1977
Swiss companies established in 1977
Vehicle manufacturing companies disestablished in 1982
Swiss companies disestablished in 1982